Malay Kingdom may refer to:
 Melayu Kingdom, the 7th to 14th century classical Malay kingdom based on the island of Sumatra
 Kingdoms or polities, both historical and present, established in Malay world or Malay archipelago. Most prominent among others are Malacca Sultanate, Johor-Riau-Lingga Sultanate, and Brunei Sultanate
 Malaysia, a nation formed as a federation of several Malay kingdoms and states